Fonda may refer to:

People
 Fonda (surname)
 Fonda Metassa, an Australian rugby league footballer

Places

United States
 Fonda, Iowa, in Pocahontas County
 Fonda, New York, in Montgomery County
 Fonda, North Dakota, an unincorporated community

Other uses
 Fonda (band), an American indie pop band
 Fonda (U.S. Supreme Court case), an 1886 case (117 U.S. 516)